Bondoukou Department is a department of Gontougo Region in Zanzan District, Ivory Coast. In 2021, its population was 453,841 and its seat is the settlement of Bondoukou. The sub-prefectures of the department are Appimandoum, Bondo, Bondoukou, Gouméré, Laoudi-Ba, Pinda-Boroko, Sapli-Sépingo, Sorobango, Tabagne, Tagadi, Taoudi, and Yézimala. It is the easternmost department of Ivory Coast.

History
Boundoukou Department was created in 1969 as one of the 24 new departments that were created to take the place of the six departments that were being abolished. It was created from territory that was formerly part of Est Department. Using current boundaries as a reference, from 1969 to 1974 the department occupied the same territory that is today Zanzan District.

In 1974, Boundoukou Department was divided to create Bouna Department. From 1974 to 1988, Bondoukou Department occupied the same territory that is today Gontougo Region. In 1988, Boundoukou Department was divided a second time to create Tanda Department.

In 1997, regions were introduced as new first-level subdivisions of Ivory Coast; as a result, all departments were converted into second-level subdivisions. Bondoukou Department was included as part of Zanzan Region.

Boundoukou Department was divided a third time in 2009 to create Sandégué Department.

In 2011, districts were introduced as new first-level subdivisions of Ivory Coast. At the same time, regions were reorganised and became second-level subdivisions and all departments were converted into third-level subdivisions. At this time, Boundoukou Department became part of Gontougo Region in Zanzan District.

Maps of historical boundaries

Notes

Departments of Gontougo
1969 establishments in Ivory Coast
States and territories established in 1969